The Tokyo Cadets or the Tokyo Boys, was the name given to the group of forty five youth recruits of the Indian National Army who were sent to the Imperial Japanese Army Academy or Imperial Japanese Army Air Force Academy to train as fighter pilots in 1944 by Subhas Chandra Bose. The cadets were captured as prisoners of war after Japan surrendered, but were released in 1946 after the end of the INA trials. The cadets became officers in the Indian forces, Burma Navy, Pakistan forces, and private pilots. Some of them became general officers.

Notable members
 Air Cmde Ramesh Sakharam Benegal, MVC, AVSM (Retd), Indian Air Force.

References

Sources
 Ayer, Subbier Appadurai, Unto Him a Witness: The Story of Netaji Subhas Chandra Bose in East Asia, Thacker, 1951
 The Contemporary, Society for Contemporary Studies, University of Michigan, v.14, 1970

Further reading
BURMA to JAPAN with Azad Hind: A War Memoir (1941–1945) Ramesh Sakharam Benegal, Lancer Publishers, New Delhi 2009  
Bhargava M.L. Indian national army Tokyo cadets 1986. New Delhi
 Subhash Chandra Bose Academy

External links
 The list of the Tokyo Cadets , Subhas Chandre Bose Academy (Japanese)

Youth organisations based in India
Indian National Army
Military history of India
Indian independence movement